Wen Ken Group is a family-owned group of companies and one of the largest Traditional Chinese Medicine companies in Southeast Asia. As a family business, the group has seen 3 generations and 5 successions. Founded in 1937, in what was then the colonial Malaya, Wen Ken Group specialises in the research and development, production and marketing of Traditional Chinese Medicine, Pharmaceuticals, Over-the-Counter (OTC) drugs and health products. In recent years, the group has also gone into the production and development of functional food and drink products. In general, the group's products are distributed to more than 15 countries including Indonesia, Brunei and Thailand.

Wen Ken Group consists of the headquarter, Wen Ken Drug Co. Pte Ltd in Singapore, and its subsidiary companies located in both Singapore and Malaysia respectively. The subsidiary companies practically function as independent business components and each specialises in one of the following fields: (i) Brands & Products, (ii) Manufacturing, (iii) Marketing, Distribution, Wholesale & Market Maker, (iv) Investments & Properties, (v) Intellectual Property and (vi) Services. Wen Ken's factories and offices (including the brand's licensee) in Southeast Asia occupy a total land area of more than 40,000 square meters, hiring more than 1,000 employees.

History
Wen Ken Group originated as a modest enterprise in 1937. There were four founding members, Foo Yin, Chan Seng Koon, Chong Tang Seong and Foo Yew Ming. Three of them were Hakkas from Yongding, Fujian and one was a Hakka from Guangdong, and were part of the mass Chinese emigration movement to the Nanyang region in the early 20th century. The name Wen Ken in Mandarin is "yong jian", where "yong" refers to the district of Yongding.

Many of the early immigrants to the region were susceptible to common ailments such as coughs, overheating, headaches and skin rashes as they strove to adapt to the searing tropical climate and long hours of labour under the sun. As basic health care was not easily available to the general masses before the 1940s, a trip to the medical clinic was hardly an option for these immigrants who survived on meager salaries. Having observed this, the four friends decided to market their own traditional recipes of medical remedies in the hope of catering to the basic healthcare needs of the masses at affordable prices. The group launched the Three Legs Brand which concentrated on four main products: Three Legs Cough Relief, Three Legs Cooling Water (to relieve body overheating), Three Legs Headache Powder and Three Legs Tinea Skin Solution.

With the end of WWII in 1945, the economy in the region began to pick up. The burgeoning demand for the Three Legs Brand products prompted the group to shift their production from the small shophouse in Singapore to a new factory in Johor Bahru in order to increase the scale of production.

In the 1950s, the second generation directors successfully took the Three Legs products to beyond Singapore and West Malaysia, establishing the brand in East Malaysia, Brunei and Indonesia. In 1968, a second manufacturing plant was set up in Petaling Jaya, Malaysia, solely for the production of the cooling water.

In the 1980s, an automated manufacturing process using the latest technology was implemented, enhancing the efficiency and quality of production. In late 1980s, the company started packaging its Three Legs Cooling Water in plastic bottles instead of glass bottles. This new lightweight packaging led to a huge increase in the sales of the cooling water.

Into the new millennium
Since the 1990s, under the leadership of the 3rd generation directors (who are also the direct descendants of the original founders), the group has established a firm foothold in the international market. Additionally, the group also began operating as a corporate angel investor, having set up its own investment arm, Wen Ken Investment Pte Ltd. This independent business unit looks into different areas of investment opportunities in health, food and beverage, manufacturing, marketing, distribution, wholesale, media and health-related services such as gyms, spas and resorts.

In 1997, Wen Ken invested angel funds to establish a joint venture, MarinEx Pharmaceuticals with Singapore Bio-innovations (a Life sciences, an investment arm of Singapore Economic Development Board). The company works with the Ocean University of China (located in Qingdao) in the use of biotechnology to extract from rich marine resources for the manufacturing of health and skin care products.

In 1999, Wen Ken provided venture capital for Singaporean entrepreneur Mr. Joe Fam to set up the company GlucosCare International. The company produces glucose-management herbal tea products that are suitable for diabetics and health-conscious consumers. Mr. Joe Fam had revealed in a number of interviews that GlucosCare International was created in light of a fast-growing trend of diabetes mellitus in developed and developing countries where there arose a need to address the treatment of high blood sugar patients with an alternative and more natural source of medicine rather than the mainstream synthetic drugs. In December 2011, GlucosCare was awarded the Singapore Prestige Brand Award (SPBA) in the Regional Brand category. GlucosCare Tea, which is the flagship product of GlucosCare International, is sold in over 20 countries around the world including Kuwait in the Middle East and Poland in Eastern Europe.

In 2007, Wen Ken Group entered into a corporate tie-up with an established Traditional Chinese Herbal Tea company founded in 1935, 'Zhen Zhen' (Chinese: 真真, also known as 'Chun Chun' in Cantonese pronunciation). 'Zhen' in Chinese ('真') means true and when doubled for emphasis, it is supposed to signify 'very true'. With the tie-up, Zhen Zhen's official name became 'Zhen Zhen Hao Herbal Tea'. Their current business consists of two flagship herbal tea mixes: Zhen Zhen Hao Cooling Tea and Zhen Zhen Hao Fever & Flu Tea.

In 2011, Three Legs Brand started its licensing and joint venture operation in Indonesia with Kino Indonesia.

Three Legs Brand
According to the company's official website, the brand logo features two legs on solid ground and an extra leg to suggest support and how it helps to speed up the healing process. The three running legs are supposed to symbolise the tri-values of 'Diligence' (striding leg), 'Humility' (kneeling leg)' and 'Parity' (inverted leg at the top). The three running legs are encased in double circles: the outer circle represents the stakeholders, which includes business partners, shareholders, distributors, suppliers & end-consumers; the inner circle represents the staff and the internal management team within the organisation. Together, the brand logo conveys the dynamic spirit, unity and progress of the organisation.

Manufacturing plant

Wen Ken owns one of the largest GMP (Good Manufacturing Practice)-certified manufacturing plants with licences to produce Chinese and Herbal Medicine, Over-the-Counter products, and Pharmaceuticals in Southeast Asia. Under Masterchem Laboratory, Wen Ken also specialises in Research & Development (R&D), registration, manufacturing, packaging of health products as part of their available services.

The plant covers 116,261 sq ft (11,626 m2) of land area and is located in Johor Bahru.  It is operated by one of Wen Ken's wholly owned subsidiary companies, Syarikat Wen Ken Drug Sdn Bhd.

Products

Controversies 
In Indonesia, Wen Ken Group disputes with PT. Sinde Budi Sentosa (Sinde) over the registration of trademarks "Badak" (literally "rhinoceros") and "Lasegar" by Sinde from 2008, after the contracts between WKG and Sinde ended in February 4 of the same year. The Supreme Court of Indonesia later cancelled the lawsuit by Sinde.

Corporate social responsibility
Wen Ken Group is built upon the fundamental principle of 'Love and Gratitude'. These are values laid down by its founders and they form the cornerstone of the group's business philosophy. According to the group, "Love represents care for the community while Gratitude encompasses being grateful for what we have and learning to pass the blessings on by giving back to society." Over the decades, the company has carried out a series of CSR initiatives to encourage their employees to be active participants in community work and to promote the spirit of volunteerism and giving back.

Wen Ken Group is very active in the area of CSR (corporate social responsibility). Apart from being a regular donor, the group is also an active sponsor and has organised several events to support different charity and educational causes. Some nonprofit organisations which Wen Ken Group has worked with include the Home Nursing Foundation (Singapore), Children Cancer Foundation (Singapore), National Kidney Foundation of Malaysia and several others.

In 2011, the Director of Wen Ken Group, Mr. Fu Siang Jeen was named one of the top entrepreneurs at the Singapore Entrepreneur of the Year Award.  The Award, jointly organised by the ASME (Association of Small and Medium Enterprises) and the Rotary Club of Singapore, ‘recognises and inspires entrepreneurship in the local SME community.' Mr. Fu also emerged as the overall winner in the subcategory for 'Social Contribution', having garnered the highest score in terms of social contribution, involvement in environmental policies, encouraging employee involvement in community activity and other efforts that value-add to the community at large.

Awards
 Singapore Prestige Brand Award 2008 -Heritage Brands category (Awarded to Three Legs Brand)
 "The BRANDLAUREATE"- SMEs CHAPTER AWARDS 2007 (Category for Best Brands in HealthCare – Pharmaceutical)
 Malaysia Good Design Mark 2008 (Awarded to Cool Rhino)
 Malaysia Good Design Mark 2011 (Awarded to Three Legs Pe Pa Kao)
 Singapore Prestige Brand Award 2011 -Regional Brands Category (Awarded to GlucosCare International)
 Entrepreneur of the Year 2011 for Social Contribution (Awarded to Mr. Fu Siang Jeen, managing director of Wen Ken Group)
Indonesia Top Brand Award 2012 – Best Body Heatiness Cooling Beverage under Pharmaceutical Category (Awarded to Three Legs Brand)
Indonesia Best Brand Awards 2012 for Anti Body Heatiness Category (Awarded to Three Legs Brand)
Indonesia The Walt Disney Company for Product of the Year 2013 (Awarded to Cap Kaki Tiga Anak)
Malaysia The Golden Eagle Award 2013, under Excellent Eagle Award (Awarded to Wen Ken (M) Marketing Sdn Bhd, formerly known as Troika Marketing Sdn Bhd)
Malaysia Sin Chew Business Excellence Award 2014 for Business Sustainability Excellence Award (Awarded to Syarikat Wen Ken Drug Sdn Bhd)
Singapore Prestige Brand Award 2017 – Heritage Brand Category (Awarded to Three Legs Brand)

References

External links
Official website

Health care companies established in 1937
Pharmaceutical companies of Singapore
Traditional Chinese medicine
Hakka culture in Singapore
1937 establishments in Singapore
Pharmaceutical companies established in 1937